Laurence Richardson (or Lawrence Richardson; 1701–1753) was an Irish Roman Catholic prelate who served as the Bishop of Kilmore from 1747 to 1753.

A Dominican friar, he was appointed the Bishop of the Diocese of Kilmore by Pope Benedict XIV on 6 February 1747. His episcopal ordination took place in Dublin on 1 May 1747; the principal consecrator was the Most Reverend John Linegar, Archbishop of Dublin.

After a long illness, Bishop Richardson died in Dublin on 29 January 1753, aged 52, and was buried in St James' Cemetery, Dublin.

Notes

References

 
 
 

1701 births
1753 deaths
18th-century Roman Catholic bishops in Ireland
Roman Catholic bishops of Kilmore
Irish Dominicans
Dominican bishops